Saaideh is a  local authority  in the Baalbek District of the Baalbek-Hermel Governorate in Lebanon.

History
In 1838, Eli Smith noted es-Su'eiyideh's population as being predominantly  "Greek" Christians.

References

Bibliography

External links
Saaideh, localiban

Populated places in Baalbek District